HappinessCharge PreCure! is the eleventh anime television series in Izumi Todo and Bandai's Pretty Cure franchise, produced by Asahi Broadcasting Corporation and Toei Animation, celebrating the series' 10th anniversary. The series follows Hime Shirayuki, the Princess of the Blue Sky Kingdom and Megumi Aino, a girl chosen by the Crystal of Love. Together with the guidance from Blue, they became the legendary warriors called Pretty Cure in order to collect all the PreCards and stop the Phantom Empire from taking over the Earth. The series aired in Japan between February 2, 2014 and January 25, 2015, replacing Dokidoki! PreCure (later replaced by Go! Princess PreCure) in its initial timeslot. The first 34 episodes also feature special "10th Anniversary Congratulatory Messages" performed by one of previous Pretty Cures in the franchise, including the HappinesCharge Cures themselves.


Episode list

See also
HappinessCharge PreCure! the Movie: The Ballerina of the  Land of Dolls - An animated film based on the series.
Pretty Cure All Stars New Stage 3: Eternal Friends - The sixth Pretty Cure All Stars crossover film which stars the HappinessCharge Pretty Cures.

References

Pretty Cure episode lists
Lists of science fiction television series episodes